Arthur Ray "Hawk" Hawkins (12 December 1922 – 21 March 2004) was an American naval aviator and flying ace of World War II. He was the United States Navy's tenth leading ace with 14 aerial victories to his credit.

Early life
Hawkins was born in Zavalla, Texas on 12 December 1922. At the age of 19 in 1942, he joined the United States Navy after the death of his brother, a United States Army Air Force fighter pilot, who was shot down in the South Pacific.

Naval career

1940s
Hawkins was designated a Naval Aviator and commissioned an ensign on 1 January 1943. He was then attached to Fighter Squadron 31 (VF-31) aboard the aircraft carrier  from January to October 1944.

While flying from Cabot in 1944, Hawkins was credited with 14 confirmed and three probable kills, all while flying F6F Hellcats. His first victory was near Truk on 29 April 1944 when, seconds after launch from Cabot, he shot down an attacking Japanese torpedo bomber.  He subsequently shot down three enemy aircraft on 19 June during the Battle of the Philippine Seas "Marianas Turkey Shoot," one on 8 July during the Battle of Guam, five on 13 September near Mindanao in the Philippine Islands, and four on 21 September during the Battle of Luzon in the Philippines.

Hawkins volunteered for a second tour of duty aboard  from June 1945 through October 1945, when VF-31 was dissolved. Hawkins' war record included destroying 39 aircraft on the ground and assisting in the sinking of a battleship.  He was awarded the Navy Cross three times, the Distinguished Flying Cross three times, and three Air Medals.

After World War II, Lieutenant Hawkins flew with the U.S. Navy Blue Angels flight demonstration team from 1948 to 1950, flying the Grumman F8F Bearcat piston-engine fighter and later the Grumman F9F-2 Panther jet fighter.

1950s
When the Korean War broke out in 1950, the Blue Angels were dissolved, with the majority of the pilots forming Fighter Squadron 191 (VF-191), nicknamed "Satans Kittens".

After the Korean War, the Blue Angels were re-formed, and Lieutenant Commander Hawkins was recalled to serve as their flight leader from 1952 through 1953. During this time, he was the first pilot to survive an ejection from a supersonic aircraft. Since he could not reach the pre-ejection lever due to his inverted position, his canopy did not separate and he ejected through the canopy, possibly becoming the first pilot to do that as well.

1960s–1970s
In the 1960s, Hawkins commanded Naval Air Station Atsugi in Japan, where he worked to recover Japanese family artifacts lost during World War II. For this work, he was awarded the Emperor of Japan Third Order of the Sacred Treasure.

Later life and family
Hawkins retired from the U.S. Navy as a captain in 1973 and subsequently worked with the National Museum of Naval Aviation in Pensacola, Florida, retiring in 1997 as its chief-of-staff.

Hawkins' daughter, Jill Hawkins Votaw, followed in his footsteps and was commissioned as an ensign in the U.S. Navy, graduating in 1980 from the United States Naval Academy as a member of the first class to graduate from the academy that included women. She retired from the Naval Reserve as a captain in 2010.

In 1984, Hawkins was inducted into the National Aviation Hall of Fame and in 2001 into the Texas Aviation Hall of Fame. In 2006, Captain Hawkins was inducted into the Naval Aviation Hall of Honor.

Hawkins died on 21 March 2004 in Pensacola, Florida.

References

1922 births
2004 deaths
United States Navy personnel of the Korean War
American Korean War pilots
American World War II flying aces
Aviators from Texas
National Aviation Hall of Fame inductees
People from Angelina County, Texas
Recipients of the Navy Cross (United States)
Recipients of the Distinguished Flying Cross (United States)
Recipients of the Air Medal
United States Navy officers
United States Navy pilots of World War II
Military personnel from Texas